Slutsk District is a second-level administrative subdivision (raion) of Belarus in the Minsk Region.

Notable residents 

 Alena Kish (1889 or 1896, Ramanava (now Lenina) village - 1949), Belarusian primitivist painter

 Jurka Listapad (1897, Varkavičy village  - 1938), active participant in the Belarusian independence movement and anti-Soviet resistance, publicist and a victim of Stalin's purges of 1937-38.

 Mikola (Mikalai) Statkevič (b. 1956, Liadna village), Belarusian politician and political prisoner

 Uladzimier Teraŭski (1871, the village of Ramanaŭ (currently known as the village of Lenin) - 1938), Belarusian composer, choirmaster and a victim of Stalin’s purges. He wrote music to a number of popular Belarusian songs such as Vajacki Marš and Kupalinka

References

 
Districts of Minsk Region